Abbey Crunch was a British biscuit brand produced by McVitie's.  The tag line was "the original oat biscuit".

Stephen Fry in his autobiography Moab Is My Washpot mentions "Abbey Crunch biscuits" as the first in a long list of pleasurable items.

According to Don Quinn, organiser of the Colchester Food and Drink Festival, the Colchester Priory Biscuit created in the 1800s by two unknown local bakers, and this later morphed into Abbey Crunch, and in turn morphed into the Hobnob, both of which are sweeter due to the addition of golden syrup.

References

Biscuit brands
Food brands of the United Kingdom
Oat-based dishes
United Biscuits brands
Defunct brands